Shamsabad-e Takht (also Romanized as Shamsābād-e Takht) is a village in Mohammadabad Rural District, in the Central District of Marvdasht County, Fars Province, Iran. At the 2006 census, its population was 699, in 183 families.

References 

Populated places in Marvdasht County